Cova Água is a settlement in Cantagalo District, São Tomé Island in the nation of São Tomé and Príncipe. Its population is 363 (2012 census). It lies on the coast, directly north of Santana.

Population history

References

Populated places in Cantagalo District
Populated coastal places in São Tomé and Príncipe